The 1977 Louisville Open, also known as the Louisville International Tennis Classic, was a men's tennis tournament played on outdoor clay courts at the Louisville Tennis Center in Louisville, Kentucky, United States. It was the eighth edition of the tournament and was held from 25 July through August 1, 1977. The tournament was part of the Grand Prix tennis circuit and categorized as a Four Star event. The singles final was won by first-seeded Guillermo Vilas who received $20,000 first prize money. It was Vilas' third title win at the tournament after 1974 and 1975.

Finals

Singles
 Guillermo Vilas defeated  Eddie Dibbs 1–6, 6–0, 6–1
 It was Vilas' 7th singles title of the year and the 26th of his career.

Doubles
 John Alexander /  Phil Dent defeated  Chris Kachel /  Cliff Letcher 6–1, 6–4

References

External links
 International Tennis Federation (ITF) tournament details

Louisville Open
Louisville Open
Louisville Open
Louisville Open